Aneri Vajani (born 26 March 1994) is an Indian actress who primarily works in Hindi television. She made her acting debut with Kaali – Ek Punar Avatar as Paakhi in 2012. Vajani is best known for her portrayal of Nisha Gangwal in Nisha Aur Uske Cousins and Saanjh Mathur in Beyhadh.

Vajani portrayed Pari Malhotra in the web series Silsila Badalte Rishton Ka Season 2, Pranati Mishra in Pavitra Bhagya and Malvika Kapadia in Anupamaa.

Early life
Vajani was born on 26 March 1994 in a Gujarati family.

Career

Debut and breakthrough (2012-2015)
Vajani made her acting debut with the role of Paakhi in Kaali – Ek Punar Avatar in 2012. It ended in 2013 and was based on the famous Nitish Katara murder case. She then played Shanaya Khan in the 2013 show Crazy Stupid Ishq alongside Hiba Nawab, Harsh Rajput and Vishal Vashishtha.

Vajani portrayed Nisha Gangwal Kumar in Nisha Aur Uske Cousins opposite Mishkat Varma from 2014 to 2015. Her performance as Nisha earned her nomination at Indian Telly Award for Indian Telly Award for Fresh New Face - Female. She next played Arushi, a swimmer in Pyaar Tune Kya Kiya Season 7.

Lead roles and success (2016-2020)
Vajani next portrayed Saanjh Mathur Sharma in Beyhadh opposite Kushal Tandon and Jennifer Winget from 2016 to 2017. She received praises for her performance. She then appeared as Riddhi in Yeh Hai Aashiqui Season 4 where she reunited with Varma.

In 2016, she featured in Arre's I Don't Watch TV as Tulsi. It marked her web debut. In 2018, she played Shreya in Laal Ishq opposite Samridh Bawa. She portrayed Pari Malhotra in her second web show, Voot's Silsila Badalte Rishton Ka Season 2 opposite Kunal Jaisingh.

Vajani then played Pranati Mishra Khurana in Pavitra Bhagya, where she reunited with Jaisingh. She received ITA Award for Best Actress Popular nomination for her performance. She next appeared as Arundhati Singh in MX Player's web series Cookiees.

Recent work and further career (2021-present)
She made her film debut with the Telugu film FCUK: Father Chitti Umaa Kaarthik where she was seen as Priyanka. She also played a character named Aneri in the short film I Hate Goodbyes.

In 2021, she started portraying Malvika Kapadia in Anupamaa. She quit the show permanently in 2022 to participate in Fear Factor: Khatron Ke Khiladi 12 claiming that "there is no scope of coming back as it's all over for her role".

She appeared in the music video Phase in 2022.

Filmography

Television

Web series

Films

Music videos

Awards and nominations

See also 
List of Indian television actresses
List of Hindi television actresses

References

External links

 
 

1994 births
Living people
Gujarati people
Indian television actresses
Actresses from Mumbai
Actresses from Gujarat
People from Navsari district
Fear Factor: Khatron Ke Khiladi participants